Sylvia Marianne Malmberg Liljefors (born 9 November 1944; also known as Sylvia Malmberg and Sylvia Malmberg-Liljefors) is a Swedish curler.

In 2005 she was inducted into the Swedish Curling Hall of Fame.

Teams

References

External links
 
 

Living people
1944 births
Swedish female curlers
Swedish curling champions